George of Greece may refer to:

 George I of Greece - King of Greece from 1863 to 1913
 George II of Greece - King of Greece from 1922 to 1924 and from 1935 to 1947
 Prince George of Greece and Denmark - second son of King George I and Grand Duchess Olga